Mingol (also Romanized as Mīngol; also known as Mangol, Mangowl, Mengowl, and Mingul) is a village in Sumay-ye Shomali Rural District, Sumay-ye Beradust District, Urmia County, West Azerbaijan Province, Iran. At the 2006 census, its population was 315, in 55 families.

References 

Populated places in Urmia County